Adara Kanda is a mountain in Sri Lanka.

See also 
 Geography of Sri Lanka
 List of mountains in Sri Lanka

References 

Mountains of Sri Lanka
Landforms of Ratnapura District